Ellis Township is a township in Ellis County, Kansas, USA.  At the 2010 census, its population was 418.

Geography
According to the USGS, it contains two cemeteries: Mount Hope and Saint Marys.

The streams of East Spring Creek, Tomcat Creek and Wild Horse Creek run through this township.

Transportation
Ellis Township contains one airport or landing strip, Ellis Landing Field.

References
 USGS Geographic Names Information System (GNIS)

External links
 US-Counties.com
 City-Data.com

Townships in Ellis County, Kansas
Townships in Kansas